The National Olympiad in Informatics usually refers to the a national competition of a particular country, which usually is the course of selection of the country's top team or persons to participate in the International Olympiad in Informatics. Examples are:

 Philippines : National Olympiad in Informatics - Philippines 
 China : 
 Singapore : National Olympiad in Informatics, Singapore 
 Greece : National Greek Competition in Informatics

References

Information science